This is a list of public art in Detroit.

This list applies only to works of public art accessible in an outdoor public space. For example, this does not include artwork visible inside a museum.

Additional works can be found at:
 Smithsonian American Art Museum, Art Inventories Catalog - database for Detroit
 The Detroit Museum of Public Art - An catalog of Detroit sculptures and murals.

Selected artworks

Further reading
 Herron, Jerry et al. Connecting the Dots: Tyree Guyton's Heidelberg Project. Wayne State University Press, 2007.
 Nawrocki, Dennis Alan. Art in Detroit Public Places. Wayne State University Press, 2008.

References 

Art in Michigan
Public art
Public art
Detroit
Michigan culture
Public art in Michigan
Tourist attractions in Detroit
Outdoor sculptures in Michigan